1920 presidential election may refer to:

 Chilean presidential election, 1920
 Guatemalan presidential election, April 1920
 Guatemalan presidential election, August 1920
 Panamanian presidential election, 1920
 1920 United States presidential election